Madrid Club de Fútbol Femenino (Madrid Women's Football Club) is a Spanish women's football club based in San Sebastián de los Reyes, Community of Madrid, that currently plays in Liga F.

History
Madrid CFF was founded in 2010 by Alfredo Ulloa who chose to play in white kits in homage to Real Madrid, although the clubs have no formal connection. Media speculation that the club would be taken over by Real Madrid in 2014 proved to be unfounded.

In 2013, after playing three seasons in the regional leagues, the club made its debut in Segunda División. Four years later, the club promoted for the first time ever to the First Division. After this promotion, the club moved to Estadio Matapiñonera in San Sebastián de los Reyes.

Season by season

Players

Current squad

Reserve team

Former players

References

External links
 Madrid CFF Official website 

Women's football clubs in Spain
Football clubs in Madrid
2010 establishments in Spain
Association football clubs established in 2010
Primera División (women) clubs
San Sebastián de los Reyes